This is a list of programs currently and soon to be broadcast by Record News, a Brazilian television news channel.

Current shows 
Alerta News (Breaking news reports/coverage, 2007–present)
Cartão de Visita (2012–present)
Eco Record News Amazônia (2012–present)
Hora News (2007–present)
Jornal da Record News (2011–present)
Late Show with David Letterman (2012; 2014–present)
 Link Record News
Record News Rural (2011–2013; 2014–present)
Zapping (2007–present)

Reruns of RecordTV's shows 

Câmera Record (2008-presente)
Domingo Espetacular (2007–present)
Esporte Fantástico (2009–present)
Fala Brasil (2007–present)
Jornal da Record (2007–present)
The Love School: A Escola do Amor (2012–present)

Reruns of RecordTV São Paulo's shows 
 Balanço Geral SP
 São Paulo no Ar

Specials 
Parintins Folklore Festival (2013–present)
Carnaval de Vitória (2016–present)

Sports 
Licensed from Fox Sports :

 International Champions Cup (2018–present)

Former shows

News and information 
Arquivo Record (2007–2016)
Câmera Record News (2007–2016)
Direto da Redação (2007–2012)
Mundo Meio-Dia (2007–2012)
Página 1 (2007–2012)
Record News Brasil (2007–2012)
Record News Nordeste (2007–2012)
Record News Paulista (2007–2016)
Record News São Paulo (2010–2012)
Record News Sudeste (2007–2012)
Record News Sul (2007–2012)
Tempo News (2007–2012)

Talk shows 
Brasília Ao Vivo (2007–2012)
Economia e Negócios (2007–2012)
Entrevista Record (2007–2012)
The Tonight Show with Jay Leno (2011–2012)

Sports 
2012 Summer Olympics
2014 Winter Olympics
Esporte Record News (2007–2012)
NASCAR Sprint Cup Series (2016–present) (highlights, Thursdays 10:30 pm

Variety 
Aldeia News (2007–2012)
Coisas de Mulher (2007–2012)
E aí, Doutor? (2012–2013)
Estilo e Saúde (2007–2012)
Man vs. Wild (2007–2013)
Mulheres em Foco (2007–2011)
NBlogs (2010–2013)
Receita pra Dois (2009–2012)

References 

Original programming by Brazilian television network or channel